Yizre'el Rugby Club is an Israeli amateur rugby club based in Yizre'el.

History
The club was founded in 1967 by a group mainly consisting of South Africans. The nickname likely refers to those origins: the '-kies' suffix (pronounced roughly like 'keys') is possibly from an Afrikaans part of speech indicating diminutive, though in most cases in Afrikaans it is spelled -tjies.

Honours
 Israeli Rugby Union Championship
 2013
 Israeli Rugby Union Cup
 2013

External links
Club website 

Israeli rugby union teams